The elm cultivar Ulmus Densa was described from specimens growing near Ashkabad as U. densa Litv. in Schedae ad Herbarium Florae Rossicae (1908). Litvinov, reporting it growing wild in the mountains of Turkestan, Ferghana, and Aksu, as well as in cultivation, considered it a species, a view upheld by the Soviet publications Trees and Shrubs in the USSR (1951) and Flora of Armenia (1962), and by some current plant lists. Other authorities take it to be a form of U minor, distinctive only in its dense crown and upright branching. The Moscow State University herbarium gives (2020) Ulmus minor as the "accepted name" of U. densa Litv..

Litvinov considered U. minor 'Umbraculifera', with its "denser crown and more rounded form", a cultivar of U. densa, calling it U. densa var. bubyriana. Rehder (1949) and Green (1964), ignoring reports of the wild form, considered U. densa a synonym of 'Umbraculifera'. The U. densa photographed by Meyer in Aksu, Chinese Turkestan on his 1911-12 expedition does not appear to be the tidy grafted cultivar 'Umbraculifera' and was said to be named 'Seda'. Zielińksi in Flora Iranica (1979) considered 'Umbraculifera' an U. minor cultivar.

In its natural range U. densa overlaps with U. pumila. The extent of hybridization between the two is not known.

Description
Litvinov noted that the tree "differed little from U. glabra Mill." [:U. minor] except in its erect branches and dense oblong crown. The leaves were "generally smaller" and the branches "smooth and lighter in colour". As with the hybrid U. × androssowii, its compact branch structure helps the tree conserve moisture.

Pests and diseases
Not known.

Cultivation
Litvinov said that U. densa was "widely cultivated" in gardens in Turkestan. It is one of a number of elms known locally as 'karagach' or 'karagatch' [:'black tree' = elm]. In western Europe U. densa Litv. was distributed by Hesse's Nurseries, Weener, Germany, in the 1930s.

Notable trees

A large, well-grown specimen stands in Dushanbe Botanic Gardens, Tajikistan (2019).

Cultivars
These include one of the oldest of elm cultivars, 'Umbraculifera', and a number of elms introduced to the West by the Späth nursery of Berlin.
 U. minor 'Umbraculifera', (?) U. minor 'Rueppellii', (?) U. 'Globosa', (?) [[Ulmus 'Koopmannii'|U.' 'Koopmannii']]

Meyer (1912) identified three cultivars of U. densa: 'Stamboul', 'Kitaisky' and 'Seda'.

Hybrid cultivars
The tree, or its cultivar form 'Umbraculifera', has hybridised with U. pumila to produce U. × androssowii.

Accessions
None known.

Notes

References

External links
efloras.org: U. densa Litv. (illustrations 10 to 14)
Specimen MW0591858 "Moscow State University herbarium" Sheet labelled "type specimen", U. densa; samarae and new leaves (1896)
  Sheet labelled Ulmus densa Litv.; USSR, 1955
  Sheet labelled Ulmus densa Litv.; specimen from Kazvin, Iran (1948)
  Sheet labelled Ulmus densa Litv.; specimen from Iraq (1957)
  Sheet labelled Ulmus densa'' Litv.; samara specimen from Isfahan, Iran (1948)
  (top left-hand specimen) Field elm leaves from Kurrum valley, Afghanistan (1879)

Ulmus articles with images
Ulmus
Elm cultivars